Michael F. O'Koren (born February 7, 1958) is an American basketball coach and former player and broadcaster originally from Jersey City, New Jersey. O'Koren was last an assistant coach at Rutgers University, serving under head coach Eddie Jordan.

A graduate of The University of North Carolina, where he played under Dean Smith, O'Koren was a first round draft pick of the New Jersey Nets in 1980 and played for the Nets and Washington Bullets in a career that ended in 1988.

After his retirement, O'Koren joined the Nets' broadcast team and remained there until 1999, when he joined Don Casey's staff as an assistant coach. He returned to Washington in 2003 when Eddie Jordan, with whom he had served in New Jersey, hired him to be the associate head coach of the Wizards. O'Koren also served as an assistant under Jordan with the Philadelphia 76ers in the 2009–10 season.

After he was let go by the 76ers, O'Koren returned to broadcasting and called high school games for FiOS1 New Jersey before Jordan hired him to serve on his staff at Rutgers in 2014.

High school career 
O'Koren attended Hudson Catholic Regional High School in Jersey City.

College career 

On a talent-laden 1977 UNC team as a freshman he averaged 13.9 points per game, scored 21 points against Duke in the ACC championship game and had 31 in the NCAA semi-finals against UNLV.   As a sophomore his scoring rose to 17.8. He scored in double figures every game and was second nationally with a 64.3 field goal percentage.

In 1979, Carolina was picked to finish third or lower in all the 1979 ACC pre-season polls. But, Dudley Bradley, the nation's best defensive player, and Al Wood, one of the top shooters in the college game, each improved their play on the opposite ends of the court. With O'Koren already proven as a fine all-around player, the Tar Heels posted a 23–6 record, tied for first place in the league's regular-season race, swept the ACC Tournament and finished third nationally in the final coaches' poll.

O'Koren was at his best in the biggest games. He grabbed a career-high 20 rebounds, scored 17 points, handed out seven assists and had four steals in a 74-68 homecourt win over Duke. He also held Gene Banks scoreless in the second half of that game. He finished with 22 points and five assists in a double overtime win over Virginia. In the ACC Tournament finals against Duke he had 18 points and 11 rebounds. He scored Carolina's final 10 points that day in a 71–63 victory.

As of 2013, O'Koren is the only player in North Carolina history to have scored  at least 1,500 points (1,765), 800 rebounds (815) and 300 assists (348). He also had 183 steals and a career field goal percentage of 57.2.

Professional playing career 
In his NBA career, O'Koren played in 407 games and scored a total of 3,355 points. His best year as a professional came during the 1981–82 season as a member of the Nets, appearing in 80 games and averaging 11.4 ppg.

In 1985, an analysis performed by USA Today crowned O'Koren the NBA's "Mr. Average", based on the league's players' ages, heights, weights and statistics (but not race; O'Koren was white in the predominantly-black NBA). When informed he was the NBA's average man, O'Koren said: "I don't consider myself above average or below anyone. I guess that's what makes me average."

Coaching career 
In the  season, O'Koren was an associate head coach with the Philadelphia 76ers again under Jordan.

References

External links 
Basketballreference.com page

1958 births
Living people
All-American college men's basketball players
American men's basketball players
Basketball coaches from New Jersey
Basketball players at the 1979 Pan American Games
Basketball players from Jersey City, New Jersey
Medalists at the 1979 Pan American Games
New Jersey Nets assistant coaches
New Jersey Nets announcers
New Jersey Nets draft picks
New Jersey Nets players
North Carolina Tar Heels men's basketball players
Pan American Games gold medalists for the United States
Pan American Games medalists in basketball
Parade High School All-Americans (boys' basketball)
Philadelphia 76ers assistant coaches
Rutgers Scarlet Knights men's basketball coaches
Small forwards
Washington Bullets players
Washington Wizards assistant coaches